Owings Mills Mall was a shopping mall in Owings Mills, Maryland, United States that hosted 155 stores and eateries, in the Baltimore County, Maryland, community of Owings Mills. It was owned and managed by General Growth Properties (now Brookfield Properties). While its main entrance was off Red Run Boulevard between Painters Mill Road and Owings Mills Boulevard, the mall was also accessible from the exit ramps of I-795. It was originally known as Owings Mills Town Center. The mall was completely demolished in 2017, and redeveloped in 2019 as Mill Station.

The mall's final anchor store was JCPenney, which closed its doors on April 8, 2016. Previous anchors were Bambergers, Hecht's, Macy's, Boscov's, Lord & Taylor, Saks Fifth Avenue, and Sears.  IFL (International Furniture Liquidators) was temporarily located in the space vacated by Lord & Taylor. Sticks 'N' Stuff, a furniture retailer, was temporarily located in the Sears building before it was demolished in 2004. The mall experienced the closures of several national stores, leaving many vacancies in this once upscale shopping mall.

History

The mall was announced as early as 1981, with vague plans that compared it to the White Marsh Mall in size. By late 1983, a summer 1986 opening had been announced as well as the fact that the mall was to feature 3 department store anchors with plans for two more. Anchors Saks Fifth Avenue, Bambergers, and Hecht's were announced in 1984. The mall opened on July 28, 1986 with the mall 95% leased and 80% of stores open. The area was identified as a primary growth center in 1979 by Baltimore County and originally intended to be built around a lake.  The Rouse Company planned to develop the mall and surrounding area similar to its town center project in Columbia, Maryland.  Environmental regulations changed during the time between the development of Columbia and Owings Mills and the Army Corps of Engineers concluded the lake would have a negative environmental impact.  The mall was built, but the area does not include the waterfront focal point initially planned.

Baltimore Metro Subway station 
The Owings Mills Metro Subway Station was opened by the Baltimore Metro Subway one year after Owings Mills Mall opened. Shuttle bus service with a 10 minute round trip was provided between the mall and the station. This shuttle bus service was discontinued in June 1992, leaving a less frequent bus service that provided this link only every 30 to 60 minutes. Alternatively, a one mile walk was possible between the mall and the Metro station which ran alongside an unused auxiliary parking lot of the mall, then down a hill through grass and vegetation on a winding asphalt pathway, before reaching one of the Metro parking lots.

Christina Brown murder 
At 2:18 PM on September 25, 1992, Christina Marie Brown was found dead from a gunshot wound to the back of the head along the vegetation lined portion of the path between the mall and the Metro station. She was found ten minutes after leaving work as an employee of a cleaning company under contract to Saks Fifth Avenue at the mall, and was believed to have been traveling to the Metro station, en route to her home in Baltimore City. Brown was shot after she resisted a robbery attempt, and her purse, containing about $120, was taken. The pathway was closed on November 25, 1992, in response to Brown's murder. The murder received heavy local media attention, which led to a long-standing perception that Owings Mills Mall was unsafe.

After the closure of the trail, a walk between the mall and metro became impractical for most, thereby requiring the use of regular bus service. In 1997, bus service between the two locations was improved. The ease of public transportation allowed visitors from inner city urban areas to get to and from this mall much more easily than other suburban malls in the Baltimore metropolitan area.

Decline and closure
The mall was quite popular throughout the mid-late eighties and well into the '90s.  Exclusive and upscale stores such as Saks Fifth Avenue, Williams Sonoma, and Benetton were tenants.  As a result of the renovations at other local Baltimore area suburban malls Towson Town Center and The Mall in Columbia, crime committed in and around the mall, and the shift in the socio-economic climate of the community surrounding the mall, Owings Mills Mall had steadily lost business since that time.

Saks Fifth Avenue closed in 1996, and was replaced with JCPenney.

Owings Mills Mall received growing competition as other local malls have expanded.  Towson Town Center added Nordstrom in 1991 and that was the final blow to Owings Mills Mall upscale status.  The Rouse Company purchased Towson Town Center in 1998.  The Rouse Company and General Growth Properties have continued to promote Towson Town Center and The Mall in Columbia as premier malls, while leaving Owings Mills Mall stuck in the middle.

An expansion in 1998 added Sears and Lord & Taylor, but closed in 2001 and 2002, respectively. Stix n' Stuff, a short-lived furniture retailer moved into the Sears building, but closed in 2004, and the building was subsequently demolished to make way for an adjacent residential development. IFL (International Furniture Liquidators) moved into the Lord & Taylor building, but was short-lived and closed soon after. The building remained vacant until demolition.

When Macy's acquired Hecht's in late 2006, Macy's moved into the former Hecht's building, and Boscov's moved in to the original Macy's building. However, Boscov's announced in 2008 that this location would close as part of a plan to close 10 locations due to the company filing for Chapter 11 Bankruptcy. This left JCPenney and Macy's as the remaining anchors.

An October 2010 story on the mall in the Baltimore Sun stated that the mall was 22.6% vacant. WBAL-TV reported on November 10, 2011, that Owings Mills Mall would be demolished in 2013, with a new "outdoor style" mall similar to the revamped Hunt Valley Towne Centre to be completed by 2014. An October 2014 story in the Baltimore Business Journal stated that the mall was "about half vacant."

In late September 2015, the interior of the mall was closed, leaving only Macy's, JCPenney, out-parcel restaurants and movie theater in operation. Macy's closed in November 2015, and JCPenney announced on January 13, 2016, that would close its Owings Mills location in the Spring.

Fixtures from the mall were auctioned in March 2016. Demolition of the mall started in August 2016, and was completed in March 2017.

Redevelopment as Mill Station

As of March 2017, the mall was completely demolished, and readied for redevelopment.

On December 5, 2017 it was announced that the property would be redeveloped as a lifestyle shopping center called Mill Station.  The $108 million project will be  and anchored by Costco, Lowe's, and Dick's Sporting Goods. There will be at least 30 total tenants.  Construction began in early 2018 and was completed in early 2019. Costco however, opened in October 2018. The existing 17-screen AMC Theatres, originally a General Cinema opened in 1998, was also fully remodeled.

Peripheral properties
Owings Mills Restaurant Park opened next to the mall in 1998; it is a collection of five sit-down restaurants such as Red Lobster and the Olive Garden. A mixed-use, transit-oriented development first called Owings Mills Metro Centre (now Metro Centre at Owings Mills), exists alongside Mill Station.

References

External links
 DEAD MALL SERIES : Owings Mills Mall

Shopping malls in Maryland
Baltimore County, Maryland landmarks
Tourist attractions in Baltimore County, Maryland
Shopping malls established in 1986
Shopping malls disestablished in 2015
Demolished shopping malls in the United States
1986 establishments in Maryland
2015 disestablishments in Maryland
Buildings and structures in Owings Mills, Maryland
Buildings and structures demolished in 2016
Demolished buildings and structures in Maryland